CLK3 may refer to:
CLK3 (gene)
 Lucknow Airpark, Ontario, Canada, former Transport Canada LID: CLK3